The Warfield, San Francisco, California, October 9 & 10, 1980 is a live album by the rock band the Grateful Dead.  It contains the two sets of acoustic music performed by the Dead on October 9 and 10, 1980 at the Warfield Theatre in San Francisco.  It was produced as a two-disc LP in a limited edition of 10,000 copies, and as a two-disc CD in a limited edition of 6,000 copies.  It was released on April 13, 2019, in conjunction with Record Store Day.

Recording 
In September and October 1980, the Grateful Dead played a series of concerts that had one set of acoustic music followed by two sets of electric music.  The tour included 15 shows at the Warfield Theatre in San Francisco, two shows at the Saenger Performing Arts Center in New Orleans, and eight shows at Radio City Music Hall in New York City.  The following year they released two live double albums recorded at these concerts – Reckoning, with all acoustic songs, and Dead Set, with all electric songs – as well as a video called Dead Ahead.

The Warfield, San Francisco, California, October 9 & 10, 1980 contains the complete acoustic sets from two of the Warfield concerts.

Track listing 
Disc 1 – October 9, 1980
Side A
"Dire Wolf" (Jerry Garcia, Robert Hunter) – 3:25
"Dark Hollow" (Bill Browning) – 3:43
"I've Been All Around This World" (traditional, arranged by Grateful Dead) – 3:52
"Cassidy" (Bob Weir, John Perry Barlow) – 6:38
"China Doll" (Garcia, Hunter) – 5:31
Side B
"On the Road Again" (Reverend Gary Davis) – 3:19
"Bird Song" (Garcia, Hunter) – 8:43
"The Race Is On" (Don Rollins) – 3:07
"Oh Babe, It Ain't No Lie" (Elizabeth Cotten) – 6:34
"Ripple" (Garcia, Hunter) – 4:37
Disc 2 – October 10, 1980
Side C
"On the Road Again:" (Davis) – 3:10
"It Must Have Been the Roses" (Hunter) – 5:55
"Monkey and the Engineer" (Jesse Fuller) – 2:50
"Jack-a-Roe" (traditional, arranged by Grateful Dead) – 4:14
"Dark Hollow" (Browning) – 3:37
Side D
"To Lay Me Down" (Garcia, Hunter) – 8:48
"Heaven Help the Fool" (Weir, Barlow) – 6:14
"Bird Song" (Garcia, Hunter) – 7:56
"Ripple" (Garcia, Hunter) – 4:28

Personnel 
Grateful Dead
Jerry Garcia – acoustic guitar, vocals
Mickey Hart – drums
Bill Kreutzmann – drums
Phil Lesh – electric bass
Brent Mydland – piano, harpsichord, vocals
Bob Weir – acoustic guitar, vocals

Production
Produced by Grateful Dead
Produced for release by David Lemieux
Mastering: Jeffrey Norman
Lacquer cutting: Chris Bellman
Recording: Betty Cantor-Jackson
Art direction, design: Masaki Koike
Photos: Jay Blakesberg

References 

Grateful Dead live albums
Rhino Records live albums
2019 live albums